The Penalty is an American psychological thriller crime film starring Lon Chaney and originally released in 1920 by Goldwyn Pictures. The movie was directed by Wallace Worsley, and written by Philip Lonergan and Charles Kenyon, based upon the pulp novel by Gouverneur Morris. The supporting cast includes Charles Clary, Doris Pawn, Jim Mason, and Claire Adams. The copyright for the film was owned by Gouverneur Morris, who wrote the novel on which the film was based. The budget for the film was $88,868.00. Portions of the film were shot in San Francisco.

The Penalty was re-released to theaters in 1926 by MGM. This was the first of five films Chaney would make with director Wallace Worsley, the others being Ace of Hearts, Voices of the City, A Blind Bargain and The Hunchback of Notre Dame.  The film exists in its complete form and is available on DVD. Chaney's leather stumps, crutches and costume from this film were donated to the Natural History Museum in Los Angeles, along with his famous make-up case.

Plot

As described in a film magazine, Blizzard (Chaney), the legless crime boss of the Barbary Coast underworld, is possessed of two ambitions. One is to get revenge upon Dr. Ferris (Clary), whose blunder during a childhood operation resulted in Blizzard's legs being hastily and unnecessarily amputated; the other is to rally the Reds in his organization and loot the city of San Francisco. 

To accomplish one, Blizzard poses for the bust of Satan created by Ferris' daughter Barbara (Adams), whom he romances to get close to the doctor. To effect the other, he organizes the city's dance hall girls to make hats in a factory room at this house, to be the symbol of the lawbreaking hordes when they are unleashed on the city. Rose (Terry), a detective, obtains entrance to his house as director of the factory. She falls in love with Blizzard for his passion for music. 

Barbara, meanwhile, learns of Blizzard's master plan: to graft her father's legs onto his stumps. During the operation, however, Blizzard sees with a clear vision his fearful, terrible past, which falls away as if a dream. When happiness comes in his marriage to Rose, his former confederate Frisco Pete (Mason), a drug addict fearful that Blizzard will reveal the identity of his gang of followers, kills him. Barbara and her lover are restored to one another.

Cast

Billed
Charles Clary as Dr. Ferris
Doris Pawn as Barbary Nell
James Mason as Frisco Pete
Lon Chaney as Blizzard
Milton Ross as Lichtenstein
Ethel Grey Terry as Rose
Kenneth Harlan as Dr. Wilmot 
Claire Adams as Barbara Ferris

Unbilled
Montgomery Carlyle as A Crook
Cesare Gravina as Art Teacher
Lee Phelps as Policeman
Madlaine Traverse as Woman
Edouard Trebaol as Bubbles
Clarence Wilson as A Crook
 Wilson Hummel

Production

To play the role of the legless cripple, Chaney wore an apparatus to simulate amputated legs, which consisted primarily of two wooden buckets and multiple leather straps, was complex and incredibly painful. Chaney's knees sat in the buckets, while his lower legs were tied back. Studio doctors asked that Chaney not wear the device, but he insisted on doing so, so that his costume would be authentic.

To assure audiences that Chaney was not an amputee, the original release of the film reportedly included a short epilogue clip showing Chaney out of character. This clip does not survive in the existing prints but in the movie itself, in the scene where Blizzard (Chaney) imagines his gang of anarchists carrying the loot from the Mint Building, Chaney is seen directing the heist unamputated.

Preservation
Prints of The Penalty are in the George Eastman House Motion Picture Collection, the Museum of Modern Art in New York City and the Turner Film Library. It is available on dvd as well.

Reception
"Hats off to Lon Chaney! As "Blizzard" ... he gives one of the screen's greatest performances. However, up to almost the very conclusion the gripping melodramatic incidents hold securely and Chaney's work is so unusually fine, it will probably hold the production for all that is necessary."—The Wid's Film Daily

"Lon Chaney, whose work in The Miracle Man won so much praise, portrays a role that might have been written for him. He is wicked and cunning, but in the end he wins sympathy and applause. Chaney makes splendid use of every opportunity."—The Moving Picture World

"It is needless to say that the picture is Chaney more than any one else...The continuity is not always smooth, the action not always sustained. Episodes are often too racy to suit the intelligence of the picture patron. But there is no denying that the feature is interesting."—Variety

"Here is a picture that is about as cheerful as a hanging---and as interesting. You can't, being an average human and normal as to your emotional reactions, really like The Penalty, any more than you could enjoy a hanging. But for all its gruesome detail you are quite certain to be interested in it... It is a remarkably good performance this actor (Chaney) gives."—Photoplay

"One of the striking things about the picture is the remarkable characterization given by Lon Chaney, who has the leading character... Rarely has the screen seen a better piece of acting."—Exhibitors Trade Review

Legacy
The Penalty was one of Chaney's breakout roles, showcasing his taste for the macabre and talent for contortion and disguise. He had previously demonstrated similar qualities in the previous year's The Miracle Man, but The Penalty and Treasure Island, both of 1920, secured Chaney's place as one of America's most famous character actors, before moving on to his more famous roles in 1923's The Hunchback of Notre Dame and 1925's The Phantom of the Opera. In 2009, Empire Magazine named it #17 in a poll of the 20 Greatest Gangster Movies You've Never Seen *Probably.

Modern score
The Penalty was shown at the Hippodrome Silent Film Festival in March 2018 accompanied by a newly commissioned score by Scottish composer Graeme Stephen for guitar (Stephen) and cello (Pete Harvey).

References

Bibliography
Skal, David J., The Monster Show, p. 65.

External links

 
 
 
 
 
 
 Fritzi Kramer, The Penalty (1920) A Silent Film Review, with stills

1920 films
1920 crime drama films
1920 horror films
American black-and-white films
American crime drama films
American horror films
American silent feature films
Films about amputees
Films about medical malpractice
American films about revenge
Films based on American novels
Films directed by Wallace Worsley
Films set in San Francisco
Goldwyn Pictures films
Articles containing video clips
1920s American films
Silent American drama films
Silent horror drama films
1920s English-language films
1920s horror drama films